Liesch is a surname. Notable people with the surname include: 

Auguste Liesch (1874–1949), Luxembourgish politician, writer, and civil servant
Dannielle Liesch (born 1978), Australian synchronized swimmer

See also
Lesch
Lisch